Rex Tso Sing-yu : 曹星如; born 15 July 1987) is a Hong Kong amateur boxer and former professional boxer. He has won several regional titles at super-flyweight and has been ranked in the world top 10 by the WBA, WBC, IBF, and WBO.

Professional career 

Tso won the WBC Asia Continental Super Flyweight title in December 2012 in a bruising 12-round contest against Timur Shailezov of Kyrgyzstan, stopping his opponent in the 10th round.

He then captured the WBO Asia-Pacific Junior Bantamweight title against Mako Matsuyama in February 2014, winning by TKO in the 8th round of the 10-round contest.

Tso then added the WBA International Super Flyweight title to his collection after defeating Michael Enriquez in March 2015.

On May 14, 2016, Tso faced Young Gil Bae. Tso made easy work out of the South Korean veteran, dominating the whole fight before stopping him in the fourth round.

He then captured the WBC Asia Super Flyweight title against Brad Hore in August 2015 and the WBO International Junior Bantamweight title against Ryuto Maekawa in October 2016.

On March 11, 2017, he successfully defended his WBO International and WBC Asian Boxing Council titles and claimed the WBO Asia-Pacific title against Hirofumi Mukai. Tso battered Mukai and dropped him twice before finishing him with a left to the body in the 8th round. With the win, Tso improved his record to 21-0.

In October 2017, Tso faced former WBA world champion Kohei Kono. Tso had sought to fight Kono while the latter a world champion, but was unable to draw him into the ring. After six rounds, Tso was unable to continue due to swelling around his eye. Nevertheless, Tso remained unbeaten by winning a technical decision.

Professional boxing record

References

External links 

Boxing Records - Rex Tso
Rex Tso articles published by the South China Morning Post 
Rex Tso - Profile, News Archive & Current Rankings at Box.Live 

Living people
1987 births
Hong Kong male boxers
Southpaw boxers
Hong Kong people
Super-flyweight boxers